Kazakhstan competed at the 2020 Summer Olympics in Tokyo. Originally scheduled to take place from 24 July to 9 August 2020, the Games were postponed to 23 July to 8 August 2021, because of the COVID-19 pandemic. It was the nation's seventh consecutive appearance at the Summer Olympics in the post-Soviet era.

Medalists

Competitors
The following is the list of number of competitors participating in the Games:

Archery

Three Kazakh archers qualified for the men's events by reaching the quarterfinal stage of the men's team recurve at the 2019 World Archery Championships in 's-Hertogenbosch, Netherlands.

Artistic swimming

Kazakhstan fielded a squad of two artistic swimmers to compete in the women's duet event, by securing an outright berth as the next highest-ranked pair vying for qualification from the Asian zone at the 2019 FINA World Championships in Gwangju, South Korea.

Athletics

Kazakh athletes further achieved the entry standards, either by qualifying time or by world ranking, in the following track and field events (up to a maximum of 3 athletes in each event):

Track & road events

Field events

Boxing 

Kazakhstan entered nine boxers (eight men and one woman) into the Olympic tournament. Rio 2016 Olympians Ablaikhan Zhussupov (men's welterweight) and silver medalist Vassiliy Levit (men's heavyweight), along with seven rookies (Bibossinov, Temirzhanov, Safiullin, Amankul, Nurdauletov, Kunkabayev, and Ryabets), secured the spots on the Kazakh squad in their respective weight divisions, either by advancing to the semifinal match or by scoring a box-off triumph, at the 2020 Asia & Oceania Qualification Tournament in Amman, Jordan.

Men

Women

Canoeing

Slalom
Kazakh canoeists qualified one boat for each of the following classes through the 2021 Asian Canoe Slalom Championships in Pattaya, Thailand.

Sprint
Kazakh canoeists qualified three boats in each of the following distances for the Games through the 2021 Asian Canoe Sprint Championships in Pattaya, Thailand.

Qualification Legend: FA = Qualify to final (medal); FB = Qualify to final B (non-medal)

Cycling

Road
Kazakhstan entered three riders to compete in the men's Olympic road race, by virtue of their top 50 national finish (for men) in the UCI World Ranking.

Track
Following the completion of the 2020 UCI Track Cycling World Championships, Kazakhstan entered two riders to compete each in the men's sprint, keirin, and omnium, based on their final individual UCI Olympic rankings.

Sprint

Keirin

Omnium

Fencing

Kazakhstan entered one fencer into the Olympic competition. 2013 Summer Universiade bronze medalist Ruslan Kurbanov claimed a spot in the men's épée as one of the highest-ranked fencers vying for qualification from Asia and Oceania in the FIE Adjusted Official Rankings.

Gymnastics

Artistic
Kazakhstan entered one artistic gymnast into the Olympic competition. Milad Karimi booked a spot in the men's individual all-around and apparatus events, by finishing fourth out of the twelve gymnasts eligible for qualification at the 2019 World Championships in Stuttgart, Germany.

Men

Rhythmic
Kazakhstan qualified one rhythmic gymnast for the individual all-around by winning the gold medal at the 2021 Asian Championships in Tashkent, Uzbekistan.

Judo
 
Kazakhstan entered six judoka (five men and one women) into the Olympic tournament based on the International Judo Federation Olympics Individual Ranking.

Karate
 
Kazakhstan entered five karateka into the inaugural Olympic tournament. 2018 world bronze medalist Darkhan Assadilov qualified directly for the men's kumite 67-kg category by finishing among the top four karateka at the end of the combined WKF Olympic Rankings. Nurkanat Azhikanov (men's 75 kg) and Moldir Zhangbyrbay (women's 55 kg) finished among the top three in the final pool round to secure places on the Kazakh squad in their respective kumite categories at the World Olympic Qualification Tournament in Paris, France, with Daniyar Yuldashev (men's +75 kg) and Sofya Berultseva (women's +61 kg) topping the field of karateka vying for qualification from the Asian zone based on the WKD Olympic Rankings.

Kumite

Modern pentathlon
 
Kazakh athletes qualified for the following spots to compete in modern pentathlon. Two-time Olympian Pavel Ilyashenko and Rio 2016 Olympian Yelena Potapenko confirmed places each in the men's and women's event, respectively, with the former finishing third and the latter fifth among those eligible for Olympic qualification at the 2019 Asia & Oceania Championships in Kunming, China.

Rowing

Kazakhstan qualified one boat in the men's single sculls for the Games by winning the bronze medal and securing the third of five berths available at the 2021 FISA Asia & Oceania Olympic Qualification Regatta in Tokyo, Japan.

Qualification Legend: FA=Final A (medal); FB=Final B (non-medal); FC=Final C (non-medal); FD=Final D (non-medal); FE=Final E (non-medal); FF=Final F (non-medal); SA/B=Semifinals A/B; SC/D=Semifinals C/D; SE/F=Semifinals E/F; QF=Quarterfinals; R=Repechage

Shooting

Kazakh shooters achieved quota places for the following events by virtue of their best finishes at the 2018 ISSF World Championships, the 2019 ISSF World Cup series, and Asian Championships, as long as they obtained a minimum qualifying score (MQS) by May 31, 2020.

Meanwhile, Zoya Kravchenko earned a direct place in the women's skeet for the rescheduled Games as the highest-ranked shooter vying for qualification in the ISSF World Olympic Rankings of 6 June 2021.

Sport climbing

Kazakhstan entered one sport climber into the Olympic tournament. Rishat Khaibullin qualified directly for the men's combined event, by advancing to the final and securing one of the seven provisional berths at the 2019 IFSC World Championships in Hachioji, Japan.

Swimming

Kazakh swimmers further achieved qualifying standards in the following events (up to a maximum of 2 swimmers in each event at the Olympic Qualifying Time (OQT), and potentially 1 at the Olympic Selection Time (OST)):

Table tennis
 
Kazakhstan entered two athlete into the table tennis competition at the Games. Anastassiya Lavrova scored a zonal-match triumph for Central Asia to book a women's singles spot at the Asian Qualification Tournament in Doha, Qatar. Meanwhile, Rio 2016 Olympian Kirill Gerassimenko was automatically selected among the top ten table tennis players vying for qualification in the men's singles based on the ITTF Olympic Rankings of June 1, 2021.

Taekwondo

Kazakhstan entered two athletes into the taekwondo competition at the Games. Rio 2016 Olympians Ruslan Zhaparov (men's +80 kg) and Cansel Deniz (women's +67 kg) secured the spots on the Kazakh taekwondo squad with a top two finish each in their respective weight classes at the 2021 Asian Qualification Tournament in Amman, Jordan.

Tennis

Kazakhstan entered seven tennis players (three male and four female).

Men

Women

Mixed

Water polo

Summary

Men's tournament

Kazakhstan men's national water polo team qualified for the Olympics by winning the gold medal and securing an outright berth at the 2018 Asian Games in Jakarta, Indonesia, marking the country's recurrence to the sport for the first time since London 2012.

Team roster

Group play

Weightlifting

Kazakhstan entered two weightlifters into the Olympic competition. London 2012 Olympian Zulfiya Chinshanlo (women's 55 kg) finished fourth of the eight highest-ranked weightlifters in the women's 55 kg category based on the IWF Absolute World Rankings, with Igor Son topping the field of weightlifters from the Asian zone in the men's 61 kg category based on the IWF Absolute Continental Rankings.

Wrestling

Kazakhstan qualified eleven wrestlers for each of the following classes into the Olympic competition. Eight of them finished among the top six to book Olympic spots in the men's freestyle (57, 65, 74, and 97 kg), men's Greco-Roman (60 and 77 kg), and women's freestyle (50 and 76 kg) at the 2019 World Championships, while three additional licenses were awarded to the Kazakh wrestler, who progressed to the top two finals of their respective weight categories at the 2021 Asian Qualification Tournament in Almaty.

Freestyle

Greco-Roman

See also
 Kazakhstan at the 2020 Summer Paralympics

References

External links 

Nations at the 2020 Summer Olympics
2020
2020 in Kazakhstani sport